Curtis Bush (born June 27, 1962) is an American world champion kickboxer who competed in the welterweight, super-welterweight, light-middleweight and middleweight divisions. A tall Southpaw possessing dangerous spinning back kicks and spinning back fists, Bush competed entirely under full contact rules and was a two-time Virginia state champion as an amateur before turning professional in 1983. After knocking out Robert Visitacion to become the North American welterweight champion in 1987, he went on to win five world titles in four weight classes and retired from competition in 1999.

Early life
Curtis Bush was born in Virginia Beach, Virginia in 1962 and in 1976, at the age of thirteen, began practicing tang soo do, eventually earning his black belt after five years. He took up kickboxing at seventeen.

Career

Bush began competing as an amateur kickboxer in 1979 and amassed a record of 15–2 with 11 knockouts over the next four years before turning professional in 1983. The highlights of his amateur career include decision wins over Darnell Studavent for the Virginia Welterweight (-67 kg/147 lb) title and Alphonzo Claiborne for the Virginia Super Welterweight (-70 kg/154 lb) belt in 1981 and 1982, respectively.

His professional kickboxing debut came on June 11, 1983, in Memphis, Tennessee when he knocked out the previously undefeated Jackie "Hollywood" Dixon 8–0 (5 KO's) in round two of a bout televised nationally on ESPN. He soon became the #9 ranked light welterweight by the PKA when he knocked out the PKA #5 world contender Ken Comer with a fifth round roundhouse kick to the head in Gatineau, Quebec, Canada.

His professional boxing debut came on February 16, 1984. Bush knocked out Charles Carter in the second round in Virginia Beach, VA. He was picked by Muhammad Ali in 1984 to box on his Champion Sports Pro Boxing Team in the Cayman Islands. Ali had watched Bush in a kickboxing match on ESPN in which he had knocked out George Morrisey with head kick in the sixth round. Bush won his boxing fight by a fourth-round knockout, which gave him a record of 3–0 with 3 KOs as a professional boxer. Bush signed a six-fight contract with Ali's lawyer, Richard Hirschfeld, to box in the Caribbean with a final bout in London, England, for a minor title. However, the company folded soon after Bush's Cayman Islands fight because of stock fraud. In 2005, captured fugitive Richard Hirschfeld committed suicide.

In 1985, Bush fought four-time PKA world champion Cliff "Magic" Thomas in a non-title bout in Atlanta, Georgia and won the fight by unanimous decision over five rounds. The bout was televised on ESPN, and the win moved Bush to #4 in the PKA rankings. A month later, Bush knocked out Canadian welterweight champion Raynald Lamarre in Montreal, Quebec, Canada. Those two wins pushed Bush to #2 in the ISKA world ratings after the demise of the PKA. He became the ISKA #1 world welterweight contender after knocking out then current #1 contender Paul Biafore in Toronto, Ontario, Canada in 1987. Bush won with fifth-round knockout. That same year, he won the ISKA North American Welterweight (-66.8 kg/147.3 lb) Full Contact Championship over Robert Visitacion in Stateline, Nevada. He dominated his opponent throughout, scoring two early knockdowns before finishing him off with a liver punch in round two.

Two years later, in 1989, he won the FFKA United States light welterweight (-67 kg/147 lb) belt in Portland, Maine against Chuck Cypress. After forcing three standing eight counts on Cypress in rounds two and three, he continued to batter his opponent in the fourth and caused his corner to throw in the towel. Having outgrown the domestic circuit, Bush won his first world championship in 1990 against #3 ISKA world title contender Emmanuel Essissima in Paris, France, where he won a twelve-round split decision over the Cameroonian for the full contact ISKA light middleweight (-72.3 kg/159.4 lb) belt.

Bush then became a world champion for the second time in 1990 with a fourth-round KO of #1 WKKO world middleweight contender Bubba "Blackhawk" Walters. Curtis won the WKKO World Middleweight (-73 kg/160 lb) Championship.

1991 saw Bush fight in the kickboxing hotbed of Amsterdam, Netherlands for the first time where he faced local fighter Marlon Boldewijn. He was stunned and given a standing eight count in round three before losing on points. Despite this setback, he was still granted a shot at his third world title and he knocked out Piotr Falender in round seven to take the ISKA's world welterweight title in his home town of Virginia Beach, Virginia. He defended this belt in Ajaccio, Corsica in 1992, outpointing Toussaint Andarelli. Bush and Andarelli would later rematch but fought to a no contest.

Having boxed occasionally since 1984, Bush won his first title in the sport on February 3, 1994, by defeating Lynn Jackson via technical knockout in round ten in Virginia Beach for the USBA Southern Light Middleweight (-69.9 kg/154 lb) belt. This earned him the spot as the IBF #1 Intercontinental contender. Returning to kickboxing, he became a four time world champion when he won a unanimous twelve-round decision over Tom Montgomery in Brighton, England, to be crowned the ISKA World Super Welterweight (-69.5 kg/153.2 lb) Full Contact Champion, setting up a unification fight with Roberto Fatica at the Dundonald International Ice Bowl in Belfast, Northern Ireland in 1996. With both Bush's ISKA super welterweight title and Fatica's WKA super welterweight (-70 kg/154.3 lb) strap on the line, Bush stopped the Italian in round eight to become the undisputed world champion.

He lost the ISKA super welterweight world title to Mark Weller when he was TKO'd in the eight round in Cambridge, England, in May 1997. He rebounded later in the year by taking the vacant ISKA North American crown in the same division with a controversial majority decision win over Melvin Murray in Toronto, Canada. Bush won his second USBA Boxing title when he won a twelve-round split decision over Kevin Hall 15-2(11 KOs) for the USBA Southern Middleweight Championship on October 2, 1997, in Virginia Beach, Virginia. 
In his first attempt at the NBA World Middleweight (-72.64 kg/160 lb) boxing title, Bush was TKO'd in round nine by Elvis Alexander in Virginia Beach on April 16, 1998. He also lost a unanimous decision to Tom Kimber at the Mass Destruction pay-per-view in Lowell, Massachusetts in May 1999 in an IKF World Middleweight (-75 kg/165.3 lb) Full Contact title challenge.

Bush retired on June 30, 1999, aged thirty-seven, after being stopped in the ninth round by Elvis Alexander again for the NBA World title.

Acting
Bush appeared with Bill "Superfoot" Wallace in five commercials for the Treco Powerstretch and SABBA in 1985. His first film role was as a deranged poacher in the 1988 Canadian film Dragon Hunt, filmed in Toronto, Ontario, Canada. Bush's character was killed by star Michael McNamara in a fight scene. Bush also had a small role as a member of the Foot gang in the films Teenage Mutant Ninja Turtles and Teenage Mutant Ninja Turtles II: The Secret of the Ooze in 1990 and 1991, respectively. In 1992, he starred in a locally produced UPN television series 464 Roadhouse, which was based on the film Roadhouse starring Patrick Swayze.  Bush played Dillon and Swayze played Dalton. The series lasted four episodes before being cancelled. Bush also released a 60-minute training video, A Beginner's Guide To Professional Kickboxing, in 1992. Ringside Products and Asian World of Martial Arts distributed it. He played a terrorist in the film Major Payne, starring Damon Wayons, in 1995. He starred in the independent horror film Psycho Kickboxer, which premiered in 1997. In 2000, Bush was chosen to do the motion-capture and face scanning for the character "Cobra" in the Xbox video game Bruce Lee: Quest of the Dragon released in 2002. Bush continues to act and played an army sergeant in the ABC series LOST in 2006 and a naval officer in the 2012 film Battleship. In 2013, Bush auditioned and won a speaking role as Security Guard #3 in Season 3 of Hawaii Five O. Episode 3.23 "He welo 'oihana'.

Personal life
Bush was honored with "Curtis Bush Day" on April 27, 1995, by Mayor Meyera E. Oberndorf in Virginia Beach, Virginia. He currently lives in Oahu, Hawaii and works as a Behavior Therapist
.

Championships and awards

Boxing
United States Boxing Association
USBA Southern Light Middleweight (-69.9 kg/154 lb) Championship
USBA Southern Middleweight (-72 kg/160 lb) Championship

Kickboxing
Virginia State Kickboxing
Amateur Virginia Welterweight (-67 kg/147 lb) Championship
Amateur Virginia Super Welterweight (-70 kg/154 lb) Championship
Fight Factory Karate Association
FFKA United States Light Welterweight (-67 kg/147 lb) Championship
International Sport Karate Association
ISKA Southeast Welterweight (-66.8 kg/147 lb) Full Contact Championship
ISKA North American Welterweight (-66.8 kg/147 lb) Full Contact Championship
ISKA North American Super Welterweight (-69.5 kg/153 lb) Full Contact Championship
ISKA World Welterweight (-66.8 kg/147 lb) Full Contact Championship
ISKA World Super Welterweight (-69.5 kg/153 lb) Full Contact Championship
ISKA World Light Middleweight (-72.3 kg/159 lb) Full Contact Championship
World Karate and Kickboxing Organization
WKKO World Middleweight (-73 kg/160 lb) Championship
World Kickboxing Association
WKA World Super Welterweight (-70 kg/154 lb) Full Contact Championship

Boxing record

Legend:

Kickboxing record

Legend:

References

External links
 

1962 births
Living people
Boxers from Virginia
Light-middleweight boxers
Middleweight boxers
American male kickboxers
Kickboxers from Virginia
Welterweight kickboxers
Middleweight kickboxers
American tang soo do practitioners
American male actors
Sportspeople from Virginia Beach, Virginia
American male boxers